(Carl Fredrik) Edmund Neupert (1 April 184222 June 1888) was a Norwegian music teacher, pianist and composer. Among Neupert's compositions, the 24 Concert-Etüden and the 24 Octav-Etüden are especially highly regarded.

Biography
Neupert was born in Christiana (now Oslo), Norway.
He was the son of Herman Wilhelm Neupert (1806–78) and Caroline Friederike Wiedmayer (1814-1878). His father was a  musician and piano teacher. 

He studied in Berlin at the   Neue Akademie der Tonkunst under  Theodor Kullak (1818–1882). He also received instruction from Friedrich Kiel (1821–1885). In 1866 he was hired as piano teacher at the Stern Conservatory in Berlin operated by Julius Stern (1820–1883).
Neupert was a teacher at the  Stern Conservatory  from 1866-1868. He then moved to Copenhagen, where he held a position at the city's conservatory for two years. In 1881 he traveled to Moscow, and in 1882 he moved to Christiania, where he taught at a piano school for children. From 1883 he stayed in New York City.

He was now best remembered as the soloist at the world premiere of Edvard Grieg's Piano Concerto in A minor.  This occurred on 3 April 1869 in the Casino Concert Hall in Copenhagen, with the Royal Danish Orchestra conducted by Holger Simon Paulli.  The piano used for the performance was lent for the occasion by Anton Rubinstein, who attended the concert.  Grieg himself was not present, due to commitments back home in Norway. Neupert was also the dedicatee of the second edition of the concerto (Rikard Nordraak was the original dedicatee), and was said to have actually composed the cadenza in the first movement.

Family
In 1870, Neupert was married to Hilda Bergh (1848–1934) and the couple had one son Robert Isidor Neuper (1871-1894).
He died in New York City and was buried at Vår Frelsers gravlund in Oslo.

References

Other sources
Andrew Adams; Bradley Martin (2011) Forgotten Romantic:The Life and Works of Edmund Neupert International Edvard Grieg Society Research Conference at Copenhagen

External links
 

1842 births
1888 deaths
Musicians from Oslo
Norwegian classical composers
Norwegian classical pianists
19th-century classical composers
Norwegian male classical composers
19th-century classical pianists
19th-century Norwegian composers
Norwegian male pianists
19th-century male musicians
Burials at the Cemetery of Our Saviour